Baikonur is a small mining town in central Kazakhstan near Jezkazgan. Coal mining began in 1914.

In 1961, the name was appropriated for the Baikonur Cosmodrome about 320 kilometres southwest of the older mining town; some sources state this was done in order to keep the actual location of the cosmodrome secret. Leninsk, the town built to support the cosmodrome, was renamed Baikonur in 1995 after the fall of the Soviet Union.

Geography
River Baikonur flows by the village.

References

Populated places in Kazakhstan